Steven Edwards (born 15 January 1991) is a footballer who plays currently plays as a defensive midfielder for VV Baronie.

Career

Club career
He formerly played for NAC and Achilles '29.

On 20 October 2019, Edwards joined Belgian club Royal Cappellen. He returned to the Netherlands in January 2020 to join SteDoCo on a deal for the rest of the season. On 24 February 2020, his contract was extended until the summer 2021.

References

External links
 

1991 births
Living people
Dutch footballers
Dutch expatriate footballers
Association football midfielders
Eredivisie players
Eerste Divisie players
NAC Breda players
Achilles '29 players
Helmond Sport players
Royal Cappellen F.C. players
Footballers from Breda
Dutch expatriate sportspeople in Belgium
Expatriate footballers in Belgium